Westward Ho! is an 1855 historical novel written by British author Charles Kingsley. The novel was based on the experiences of Elizabethan privateer Amyas Preston (Amyas Leigh in the novel), who sets sail with Francis Drake, Walter Raleigh and other privateers to the New World, namely the Preston Somers Expedition and  Raleigh's El Dorado Expedition where they battle with the Spanish.

Plot

Set initially in Bideford in North Devon during the reign of Elizabeth I, Westward Ho! follows the adventures of Amyas Leigh (Amyas Preston), an unruly child who as a young man follows Francis Drake to sea. Amyas loves local beauty Rose Salterne, as does nearly everyone else; much of the novel involves the kidnapping of Rose by a Spaniard.

Amyas spends time in the Caribbean coasts of Venezuela seeking gold, and eventually returns to England at the time of the Spanish Armada, finding his true love, the beautiful Indian maiden Ayacanora, in the process; yet fate had blundered and brought misfortune into Amyas's life, for not only had he been blinded by a freak bolt of lightning at sea, but he also loses his brother Frank Leigh and Rose Salterne, who were caught by the Spaniards and burnt at the stake by the Inquisition.

Title

The title of the book derives from the traditional call of boat-taxis on the River Thames, which would call "Eastward ho!" and "Westward ho!" to show their destination. "Ho!" is an interjection or a call to attract passengers, without a specific meaning besides "hey!" or "come!" The title is also a nod towards the play Westward Ho!, written by John Webster and Thomas Dekker in 1604, which satirised the perils of the westward expansion of London. The full title of Kingsley's novel is Westward Ho! Or The Voyages and Adventures of Sir Amyas Leigh, Knight of Burrough, in the County of Devon, in the reign of Her Most Glorious Majesty, Queen Elizabeth, Rendered into Modern English by Charles Kingsley. This elaborate title is intended to reflect the mock-Elizabethan style of the novel. Viola's use of "Westward ho!" in William Shakespeare's Twelfth Night is an earlier reference.

Kingsley dedicated the novel to Sir James Brooke, Rajah of Sarawak, and Bishop George Selwyn, whom he saw as modern representatives of the heroic values of the privateers who were active during the Elizabethan era.

Themes

Westward Ho! is an historical novel which celebrates England's victories over Spain in the Elizabethan era. The novel based its premise around the real life Preston Somers Expedition which took place in 1595. This was a raid in which the Spanish colonial city of Caracas in South America was captured and sacked by privateers led by Amyas Preston and George Somers.

Although originally a political radical, Kingsley had by the 1850s become increasingly conservative and a strong supporter of overseas expansion. The novel consistently emphasises the superiority of English values over those of the "decadent Spanish". Although originally written for adults, its mixture of patriotism, sentiment and romance deemed it suitable for children, and it became a firm favourite of children's literature.

A prominent theme of the novel is the 16th-century fear of Catholic domination, and this reflects Kingsley's own dislike of Catholicism. The novel repeatedly shows the Protestant English correcting the worst excesses of the Spanish Jesuits and the Inquisition.

The novel's virulent anti-Catholicism, as well as its racially insensitive depictions of the South Americans, has made the novel less appealing to a modern audience, although it is still regarded by some as Kingsley's "liveliest, and most interesting novel."

Adaptations

In April 1925, the book was the first novel to be adapted for radio by the BBC. The first movie adaptation of the novel was a 1919 silent film, Westward Ho!, directed by Percy Nash. A 1988 children's animated film, Westward Ho!, produced by Burbank Films Australia, was loosely based on Kingsley's novel.

Legacy

The book is the inspiration behind the unusual name of the village of Westward Ho! in Devon, the only place name in the United Kingdom that contains an exclamation mark.

J. G. Ballard, in an interview with Vanora Bennett, claimed that being forced to copy lines from the novel as a punishment at the age of eight or nine was the moment he realised he would become a writer.

References

External links

1855 British novels
British historical novels
Novels by Charles Kingsley
Novels set in Devon
Novels about pirates
Novels set in Tudor England
Inquisition in fiction
British novels adapted into films
Cultural depictions of Walter Raleigh
Cultural depictions of Francis Drake
Novels adapted into radio programs
Anti-Catholic publications